The New Criterion is a New York–based monthly literary magazine and journal of artistic and cultural criticism, edited by Roger Kimball (editor and publisher) and James Panero (executive editor). It has sections for criticism of poetry, theater, art, music, the media, and books. It was founded in 1982 by Hilton Kramer, former art critic for The New York Times, and Samuel Lipman, a pianist and music critic. The name is a reference to The Criterion, a British literary magazine edited by T. S. Eliot from 1922 to 1939.

The magazine describes itself as a "monthly review of the arts and intellectual life ... at the forefront both of championing what is best and most humanely vital in our cultural inheritance and in exposing what is mendacious, corrosive, and spurious." It evinces an artistic classicism and political conservatism that are rare among other publications of its type.

It regularly publishes "special pamphlets", or compilations of published material organized into themes. Some past examples have been Corrupt Humanitarianism; Religion, Manners, and Morals in the U.S. and Great Britain; and Reflections on Anti-Americanism.

Since 1999, The New Criterion has been running the New Criterion Poetry Prize, a poetry contest with a cash prize. In 2004, The New Criterion contributors began publishing a blog, initially named ArmaVirumque, and later renamed to Dispatch.

Origin
The New Criterion was founded in 1982 by The New York Times art critic Hilton Kramer. He cited his reasons for leaving the paper to start The New Criterion as "the disgusting and deleterious doctrines with which the most popular of our Reviews disgraces its pages", as well as "the dishonesties and hypocrisies and disfiguring ideologies that nowadays afflict the criticism of the arts, [which] are deeply rooted in both our commercial and our academic culture." He went on to say: "It is therefore all the more urgent that a dissenting critical voice be heard, and it is for the purpose of providing such a voice that The New Criterion has been created."

Kramer's decision to leave The New York Times, where he had been the newspaper's chief art critic, and to start a magazine devoted to ideas and the arts "surprised a lot of people and was a statement in itself", according to Erich Eichmann.

Contributors to the journal have included Mark Steyn, Roger Scruton, David Pryce-Jones, Theodore Dalrymple, Alexander McCall Smith, Penelope Fitzgerald, and Jay Nordlinger.

In its first issue, dated September 1982, the magazine set out "to speak plainly and vigorously about the problems that beset the life of the artists and the life of the mind in our society" while resisting "a more general cultural drift" that had in many cases, "condemned true seriousness to a fugitive existence".

Reception

According to the conservative publication The New York Sun, for a quarter of a century The New Criterion "has helped its readers distinguish achievement from failure in painting, music, dance, literature, theater, and other arts. The magazine, whose circulation is 6,500, has taken a leading role in the culture wars, publishing articles whose titles are an intellectual call to arms."

Contributors 

Since the magazine's founding, many writers, poets, academics, commentators, and politicians – mostly drawn from the conservative end of the political spectrum – have written for it. Contributors include:

Conrad Black
Jeremy Black
Robert Bork
William F. Buckley Jr.
Douglas Carswell
Christian Caryl
Maurice Cowling
Theodore Dalrymple
Victor Davis Hanson
Franklin Einspruch
Malcolm Forbes
Jonathan Foreman
Simon Heffer
Gertrude Himmelfarb
Ayaan Hirsi Ali
Christopher Hitchens
Donald Justice
Donald Kagan
Frederick Kagan
Robert Kagan
Robert D. Kaplan
Henry Kissinger
Julius Krein
Hugh Lloyd-Jones
Gérard Louis-Dreyfus
Thomas F. Madden
Harvey Mansfield
Rob Messenger
Kenneth Minogue
Francis Morrone
Gary Saul Morson
Ferdinand Mount
Harry Mount
Charles Murray
Douglas Murray
George H. Nash
John Podhoretz
Norman Podhoretz
Mary Jo Salter
Roger Scruton
Lionel Shriver
Aleksandr Solzhenitsyn
George Szamuely
Kevin D. Williamson
Keith Windschuttle

Awards 
Hilton Kramer Fellowship

Since its inauguration in 2013, The New Criterions reader-funded Hilton Kramer Fellowship has been awarded to promising writers with an interest in developing careers as critics.

Edmund Burke Annual Gala

First awarded in 2012, The New Criterion’s Edmund Burke Award for Service to Culture and Society is given annually to individuals "who have made conspicuous contributions to the defense of civilization."

The publication hosts an annual gala honoring recipients of the award. Edmund Burke Award recipients include:

 Henry Kissinger, former U.S. Secretary of State 
 Donald Kagan, historian and classicist
 Ayaan Hirsi Ali, author and activist 
 Charles Murray, political scientist
 Philippe de Montebello, former museum director of the Metropolitan Museum of Art in New York
 Victor Davis Hanson, military historian, author, and classicist

New Criterion anthologies
 Counterpoints: 25 Years of The New Criterion on Culture and the Arts, edited by Roger Kimball and Hilton Kramer; Ivan R. Dee, 512 pages, (2007).  
 Against the Grain: The New Criterion on Art and Intellect at the End of the 20th Century, edited by Hilton Kramer and Roger Kimball; Ivan R. Dee, 477 pages (1995).  
 The New Criterion Reader: The First Five Years, edited by Hilton Kramer; Free Press, 429 pages (1988).

New Criterion books
 Lengthened Shadows: America and Its Institutions in the Twenty-First Century, edited by Roger Kimball and Hilton Kramer; Encounter Books, 266 pages (2004).  
 The Survival of Culture: Permanent Values in a Virtual Age, edited by Hilton Kramer and Roger Kimball; Ivan R. Dee, 256 pages (2002). , 
 The Betrayal of Liberalism: How the Disciples of Freedom and Equality Helped Foster the Illiberal Politics of Coercion and Control edited by Hilton Kramer and Roger Kimball; Ivan R. Dee, 256 pages (1999). , 
 The Future of the European Past edited by Hilton Kramer and Roger Kimball; Ivan R. Dee, 251 pages (1997). ,

The New Criterion Poetry Prize
Since 2000 the magazine has been awarding its poetry prize to a poet for "a book-length manuscript of poems that pay close attention to form." The following poets have won the prize:
 2000: Donald Petersen, Early and Late: Selected poems (Chicago: Ivan R. Dee, 2001).
 2001: Adam Kirsch, The Thousand Wells (Chicago: Ivan R. Dee, 2002).
 2002: Charles Tomlinson, Skywriting and other poems (Chicago: Ivan R. Dee, 2003).
 2003: Deborah Warren, Zero Meridian (Chicago: Ivan R. Dee, 2004).
 2005: Geoffrey Brock, Weighing Light (Chicago: Ivan R. Dee, 2005).
 2006: Bill Coyle, The God of this World to His Prophet (Chicago: Ivan R. Dee, 2006).
 2007: J. Allyn Rosser, Foiled Again (Chicago: Ivan R. Dee, 2007).
 2008: Daniel Brown, Taking the Occasion (Chicago: Ivan R. Dee, 2008).
 2009: William Virgil Davis, Landscape and Journey (Chicago: Ivan R. Dee, 2009).
 2010: Ashley Anna McHugh, Into These Knots (Lapham, MD: Ivan R. Dee, 2010).
 2011: D. H. Tracy for Janet's Cottage (South Bend, IN: St. Augustine Press, 2012).
 2012: George Green for Lord Byron's Foot (South Bend, IN: St. Augustine Press, 2012).
 2013: Dick Allen for This Shadowy Place (South Bend, IN: St. Augustine Press, 2014).
 2014: John Poch for Fix Quiet (South Bend, IN: St. Augustine Press, 2015).
 2015: Michael Spence for Umbilical (South Bend, IN: St. Augustine Press, 2016).
 2016: John Foy for Night Vision (South Bend, IN: St. Augustine Press, 2016).
 2017 Moira Egan for Synæsthesium (New York: New Criterion, 2017).
 2018 Nicholas Friedman for Petty Theft (New York: New Criterion, 2018).
 2019 Ned Balbo for The Cylburn Touch-Me-Nots (New York: New Criterion, 2019).
 2020 Bruce Bond for Behemoth (New York: New Criterion, 2021).
 2021 Nicholas Pierce for In Transit (forthcoming)

References

External links

Dispatch, The New Criterion blog

1982 establishments in New York City
Visual arts magazines published in the United States
Poetry magazines published in the United States
Monthly magazines published in the United States
Conservative magazines published in the United States
Magazines established in 1982
Magazines published in New York City